The 1987 Virginia Tech Hokies football team represented the Virginia Polytechnic Institute and State University during the 1987 NCAA Division I-A football season. It was the first season for College Football Hall of Fame coach, Frank Beamer.

Schedule

Game summaries

Clemson

Syracuse

Navy

South Carolina

at Miami (FL)

The Hurricanes, a 38-point favorite, broke a 13-13 tie with 4:51 remaining on a 1-yard TD run by Melvin Bratton. Miami put the game out of reach by scoring the final touchdown with 34 seconds left to win 27-13.

Cincinnati

References

Virginia Tech
Virginia Tech Hokies football seasons
Virginia Tech Hokies football